Francesco Carlini (January 7, 1783 – August 29, 1862) was an Italian astronomer.  Born in Milan, he became director of the Brera Astronomical Observatory there in 1832.  He published Nuove tavole de moti apparenti del sole in 1832.  In 1810, he had already published Esposizione di un nuovo metodo di construire le tavole astronomiche applicato alle tavole del sole.  Together with Giovanni Antonio Amedeo Plana, he participated in a geodetic project in Austria and Italy.  During this trip in 1821 he took pendulum measurements on top of Mount Cenis, Italy, from which he calculated one of the first estimates of the density and mass of the Earth. He died in Milan.

The crater Carlini on the Moon is named after him.

References

External links 
Plana biography (Carlini mentioned)

1783 births
1862 deaths
Scientists from Milan
19th-century Italian astronomers
Italian geodesists
Foreign Members of the Royal Society
Recipients of the Lalande Prize